Manuel Ferreira can refer to:

 Manuel Ferreira (footballer) (1905-1983), an Argentine footballer
 Manuel Ferreira (writer) (1917-1992), a Portuguese writer
 Manuel Ferreira, geneticist, Ruth Stephens Gani Medalist

See also
 Manuel Ferrara (born 1975), a French pornographic actor and director